Odia is both a surname and a given name. Notable people with the name include:

 Churchill Odia (born 1985), Nigerian basketball player
 Henry Odia (born 1990), Nigerian footballer
 Odia Coates (1941–1991), American singer

Surnames of African origin